Small ubiquitin-related modifier 2 is a protein that in humans is encoded by the SUMO2 gene.

Function 

This gene encodes a protein that is a member of the SUMO (small ubiquitin-like modifier) protein family. It is a ubiquitin-like protein and functions in a manner similar to ubiquitin in that it is bound to target proteins as part of a post-translational modification system. However, unlike ubiquitin, which is primarily associated with targeting proteins for proteasomal degradation, SUMO2 is involved in a variety of cellular processes, such as nuclear transport, transcriptional regulation, apoptosis, and protein stability. It is not active until the last two amino acids of the carboxy-terminus have been cleaved off. Numerous pseudogenes have been reported for this gene. Alternate transcriptional splice variants encoding different isoforms have been characterized.

Interactions 

SUMO2 has been shown to interact with TRIM63 and CFAP298.

Clinical significance 

Deep hypothermia protects the brain from ischemic injury, which is why it's employed for major cardiovascular procedures that necessitate cardiopulmonary bypass and a period of circulatory arrest. With an experiment conducted to moderate hypothermia, small ubiquitin-like modifier (SUMO1-3) conjugation was significantly activated in the brain. The effects of hypothermia on SUMO conjugation were evaluated in this experiment using Western blot and immunohistochemistry in animals that were either normothermic (37°C) or deep to moderate (18°C, 24°C, 30°C) hypothermic cardiopulmonary bypass. In these cells, even 30°C hypothermia was enough to significantly boost SUMO2/3-conjugated protein levels and nucleus accumulation. Deep hypothermia caused the SUMO-conjugating enzyme Ubc9 to translocate to the nucleus, implying that the increase in nuclear levels of SUMO2/3-conjugated proteins seen in hypothermic animals' brains is an active process. Deep hypothermia caused only a small increase in the amounts of SUMO2/3-conjugated proteins in primary neuronal cells. This shows that neurons in vivo have a greater capacity to activate this endogenous possibly neuroprotective mechanism when exposed to hypothermia than neurons in vitro. Identifying proteins that are SUMO2/3 conjugated during hypothermia could aid in the development of new preventive and therapeutic therapies to make neurons more resistant to a transient blood supply interruption.

References

Further reading